Peter Wong Tung-shun, JP ( born November 1951, in British Hong Kong) is a Hong Kong banker associated with the HSBC, StanChart and Citi. He retired as CEO of HSBC Asia-Pacific and became non-executive chairman of The Hongkong and Shanghai Banking Corporation, effective 7 June 2021. He holds a BComm degree from the University of Calgary in Alberta, Canada, a master’s degree in computer science and another master's degree in marketing and finance from Indiana University in the United States.

He is one of the 124 members of Hong Kong’s delegation to the Chinese People's Political Consultative Conference.

Biography 
1980: Joined Citibank and served as Deputy Financial Controller, Director of Business Development, Assistant Managing Director and Director of Banking Business.
1996: Appointed as the Director of Operating, Services, and Sales for North Asia of Citibank
1997: Joined Standard Chartered Bank and served as Director of Personal Banking for Hong Kong and China
2000: Appointed as Chief Executive for Hong Kong of Standard Chartered Bank
2002: Appointed as Director of Greater China of Standard Chartered Bank 
2005: Joined HSBC and served as General Manager of HSBC Group and an executive director of The Hongkong and Shanghai Banking Corporation
2010: Appointed as the first Chinese Asia Pacific CEO of The Hongkong and Shanghai Banking Corporation

In 2020, in a highly symbolic act that ended the bank's previous political neutrality, Wong signed a public petition supporting the Chinese leadership’s creation of a far-reaching national security law for Hong Kong. The move was understood as politically necessary to avoid punitive action against the bank by Beijing but drew widespread international and local Hong Kong criticism.

References

1951 births
Living people
Hong Kong bankers
Hong Kong chief executives
Hong Kong financial businesspeople
HSBC people
Indiana University alumni
Members of the Election Committee of Hong Kong, 2007–2012
Members of the Election Committee of Hong Kong, 2012–2017
Members of the Election Committee of Hong Kong, 2017–2021
Members of the Election Committee of Hong Kong, 2021–2026
University of Calgary alumni
Members of the Chinese People's Political Consultative Conference